13 Dead Men is a 2003 action crime thriller film written and directed by Art Camacho and starring rapper Mystikal and Lorenzo Lamas.

Premise
Master diamond thief Malichi is framed for murder and put on death row. When the corrupt warden finds that he has hidden diamonds, he tries anything he can to get him to reveal the location of the diamonds, including extending his sentence.  When Malichi realizes he is not going to find justice, he turns to Caj, a belligerent inmate who agrees to help him in order to gain his own freedom.

Cast
 Lorenzo Lamas as Santos
 Mystikal as Caj
 Ashley Tucker as Malachi
 Mia Riverton as Elizabeth DeLuca
 Shalena Hughes as Jay'me
 David Weininger as Warden Kowalksi
 Susanna King as Rayette

External links

2003 films
American action thriller films
2000s prison films
2003 crime thriller films
American prison films
Films directed by Art Camacho
2000s English-language films
2000s American films